Lord Byng Secondary School is a public secondary school located in the West Point Grey neighbourhood on the west side of Vancouver, British Columbia, Canada. The school opened in 1925 and was named in honour of The Lord Byng of Vimy, a hero of Vimy Ridge as well as the Gallipoli Campaign, who was largely responsible for the incorporation of tanks on a large scale at the Battle of Cambrai in 1917.  At the time the school opened, Lord Byng was the Governor General of Canada. The school is widely renowned in the Greater Vancouver region for its selective Byng Arts mini-school program, as well as for its varsity sports programs and wide assortment of Advanced Placement and Enriched courses.

The school was expanded and upgraded in 2003 with a library and gymnasium, as well as studios and classrooms.

In the 2005–2006 school year, Byng Arts Theatre Company and the school gained national attention and respect for staging the play The Laramie Project after the Surrey School Board banned the play.

Byng Arts Mini School

The Byng Arts Mini School is a program for students that places artistic development at the core of the high school experience through enrichment in the fine arts as well as academics. Traditionally, students have specialized in Visual Arts, Band, Strings, or Theatre, but options have expanded to include Literary Arts, Media Arts, and Choir.

The school offers a program that is designed for students who wish to direct their energies and passions towards the arts, to work within a community of students who share their interests, and to maintain strong academic achievement. 

The program promotes academic and artistic excellence through curricular and extracurricular activities in the fine arts, literary arts and applied fine arts.

Lord Byng sports
Lord Byng sports teams are named for their school mascot, the Grey Ghost. Lord Byng sports teams include Cross-country, Bantam Boys Rugby, Juvenile Boys Rugby, Bantam Girls Volleyball, Juv/Junior Girls Volleyball, Senior Girls Volleyball, Swimming, Girls Basketball, Bantam Girls Basketball, Juvenile Girls Basketball, Jr/Senior Girls Basketball, Boys Basketball, Bantam Boys Basketball, Juv/Junior Boys Basketball, Senior Boys Basketball, Bantam Boys Volleyball, Grade 8/Juvenile Girls Soccer, Senior Girls Soccer (Tier II), Girls Premier Soccer (Tier I), Tennis, Gymnastics, Ultimate, Girls Softball, Track & Field, Junior Boys Rugby, Senior Boys Rugby, Badminton, and Golf as well as inter-mural sports, such as hand-ball.

Some of their recent wins include their Cross Country team's Team Aggregate Championship award and the Grade 8 Boys Rugby City Championship for defeating Charles Tupper 15-12 in the finals. They also won the Tier II Senior Girls Basketball City Championships in the 2011 – 2012 season.

Lord Byng Music Department
Under the direction of the Fine Arts department head, Scott MacLennan (succeeded by Lisa Lan), Lord Byng has one of the best music programs in the Lower Mainland. Many of the groups, including the high-level Senior Honour Orchestra and Senior Wind Ensemble, have consistently placed first or gold in provincial and national competitions.

Lord Byng's strings ensembles have won over 25 Kiwanis Festival Gold Awards (Provincial Competition) and three Gold Awards from the National Competition MusicFest. In 2008, the Senior Honour Orchestra won the trophy for first place in the North West Orchestra Competition in Portland, Oregon, and in 2010, both Junior and Senior Honour Orchestras received gold standing in the Heritage Music Festival in Seattle, Washington. The Senior Honour Orchestra were invited to compete in the 2012 American String Teachers Association National Orchestra Festival in Atlanta, where they placed second against advanced American school orchestras. 

In March 2014, the Senior Honours Orchestra competed in the National School Orchestra Finals in the prestigious Alice Tully Hall at Lincoln Center, in New York City. This orchestra competed against several American orchestras and was crowned first-place champion of the 2014 Orchestra Cup. Trophies brought back include the National Orchestra Cup, Best Solo Violinist Award and Best String Orchestra Award.

In April 2017, the Senior Honour Orchestra competed at World Strides Festival of Golds, California, along with dozens of other orchestras, bands and choirs in North America. They obtained 1st place out of all the other music groups. On May 5th of the same year, both the Senior Honour and a combination of Junior and Intermediate Orchestras competed at the Kiwanis Festival held at Douglas College. Both orchestras obtained 1st place in their respective divisions.

The Lord Byng Symphony Orchestra is one of the few public school symphony orchestras in the province. Students are expected to perform unabridged symphonies and pieces. A few grade 12 soloists (at least one per term) are chosen to perform concertos. For the Vancouver Courier'''s 2012 "Stars of Vancouver Readers Choice Awards", readers placed the Lord Byng Symphony Orchestra in third place under the category "Classical Music Ensemble", behind the Vancouver Symphony Orchestra and the UBC Symphony Orchestra. 

Some of the classes that are offered in band and strings are:
 Beginner Band 
 Junior Band
 Intermediate Band
 Senior Band Wind Ensemble
 Junior Jazz Band
 Intermediate Jazz Band
 Senior Jazz Band
 Beginner Orchestra
 Junior Orchestra
 Intermediate Orchestra
 Senior Orchestra
 Junior Honours Orchestra
 Senior Honours Orchestra
 Junior Symphony Orchestra
 Lord Byng Symphony Orchestra (LBSO, equivalent of a senior symphony orchestra)
 Junior Choir
 Intermediate Choir
 Senior Choir
 Chamber Choir Honours

Some of the band trips include Osaka, Japan (1970), Austria and Germany (2003), New York City (2005), Italy (2007), England (2009), China (2011), France & Belgium (2013), New York City (2015), and Ireland (2017).

Achievements
Lord Byng Secondary School received a rating of 9.2 out of 10 in 2007 from an independent reviewer. It ranked 13th out of the 291 schools ranked in that same review. As of 2006, Lord Byng was tied with University Hill as the top overall ranked public school in the Lower Mainland.
In the 2014 Fraser Institutes provincial rankings, Byng was placed as the top public school.

In popular culture
 Students from the Symphony Orchestra were asked to play the accompaniment for the song "Wavin' Flag", a song written by K'Naan for the Haiti Relief Fund. This song features Canadian singers such as Avril Lavigne, Justin Bieber, Hedley, Josh Ramsay from Marianas Trench, Nikki Yanofsky etc. Lord Byng students took part in both the soundtrack and the music video recording in 2010.
 School's yards were used in the filming of X-Men Origins: Wolverine. The school doubles as Rosewood High in Pretty Little Liars and Finnegan High in Mr. Young.
 School interiors were used for the hospital scenes. Its exteriors stood in for a fictional Harding High School in Wisconsin during the second-season premiere of Masters of Horror Areas of the school were used in the filming of Hollow Man 2. Some students from the band and orchestra of the school were cast as extras in Marianas Trench's "Beside You" music video, which took place in the Chan Centre for the Performing Arts at the University of British Columbia.
 Scenes from the movie Saving Silverman were filmed at the front of Lord Byng.
 School's interior and exterior were used for the Nickelodeon film Swindle.
 The 21 Jump Street episode "God is a Bullet" was filmed in 1989 at Lord Byng. It starred Johnny Depp, Peter DeLuise, Holly Robinson Peete, Dustin Nguyen.
 Exterior shots of Lord Byng were used as Riverdale High in Riverdale.

Notable alumni

Elizabeth Ball, former Vancouver city councillor
Claire Boucher, known professionally as Grimes, Canadian singer, visual artist, and music video director. 2013 Juno Awards Breakthrough Artist of the Year
Jay Worthy, Rapper
Joey Cramer, Actor, Flight of the Navigator
Dan Mangan, Canadian folk/indie singer and two time Juno Award winner
Terry Clarke, jazz drummer
Tony Yu, Singer 
Stan Douglas, Canadian installation artist
Barry Downs, Canadian architect
Allan Graves, Senior World Bridge Champion, Canadian Bridge Hall of Fame
Marcus Haber, Canadian soccer player
Chris Haddock, screenwriter (MacGyver, Boardwalk Empire) and television producer (Da Vinci's Inquest, Intelligence)
Cory Lee, Canadian pop singer
Chris Mears, former major league baseball player and Olympian
Shaone Morrisonn, professional hockey player for the National Hockey League's Buffalo Sabres
Joyce Murray, Liberal MP for Vancouver Quadra and Minister of Digital Government
Eric Nicol, Canadian humourist and playwright
Phil Nimmons, Canadian jazz clarinetist, composer, bandleader, and academic
Carly Pope, Canadian actress, co-star of Young People FuckingRoss Rebagliati, first ever to win an Olympic gold medal for snowboarding
Doreen Patterson Reitsma, Canadian Naval Pioneer
Cobie Smulders, Canadian actress best known for playing Robin in How I Met Your Mother''
Ashleigh Ball, Singer, Voice Actress, and Musician

References

External links
 Lord Byng Secondary School
Lord Byng Student Council
 Vancouver School Board – Lord Byng
 Lord Byng Community Music Society

High schools in Vancouver
Educational institutions established in 1925
1925 establishments in British Columbia